Séverin Dumais (February 10, 1840 – April 28, 1907) was a notary and political figure in Quebec. He represented Chicoutimi-Saguenay in the Legislative Assembly of Quebec from 1888 to 1890 as a Parti National member.

He was born in Saint-Georges-de-Cacouna, Lower Canada, the son of Paschal Dumais and Éléonore Couillard, and was educated at Sainte-Anne-de-la-Pocatière. Dumais articled with his father and then F.S. McKey, qualified to practise as a notary in 1864 and set up practice in Hébertville. He married Honorine Gagné in 1887. Dumais was mayor of Hébertville from 1881 to 1890. In 1899, he was named a crown lands agent. He also served as a lieutenant in the militia.

Dumais ran unsuccessfully for a seat in the Quebec assembly in 1886, losing to Élie Saint-Hilaire. He was elected to the assembly in an 1888 by-election held after Saint-Hilaire's death and was defeated when he ran for reelection in 1890.

Dumais died in Hébertville at the age of 67.

References
 

Members of the National Assembly of Quebec
Mayors of places in Quebec
1840 births
1907 deaths